Sofia Haajanen (born 15 January 1987) is a Finnish orienteering competitor. She won a silver medal in the relay at the 2012 European Orienteering Championships in Falun.

She competed at the 2012 World Orienteering Championships. In the middle distance she qualified for the final, where he placed 33rd.

References

External links

1987 births
Living people
Finnish orienteers
Female orienteers
Foot orienteers